Emericella is a genus of fungi.

The genus name of Emericella is in honour of Emeric Streatfield Berkeley (1834 - 1898), a British Lieutnant/Major General who served in India. He was also a botanist.

Bio-active isolates called stromemycin have been found in marine Emericella. Stromemycin is a C-glycosidic depside matrix metalloproteinase inhibitor.

Species 

Emericella acristata
Emericella appendiculata 
Emericella astellata 
Emericella bicolor 
Emericella cleistominuta 
Emericella corrugata 
Emericella dentata 
Emericella desertorum 
Emericella discophora 
Emericella echinulata 
Emericella falconensis 
Emericella filifera 
Emericella foeniculicola 
Emericella foveolata 
Emericella indica
Emericella miyajii 
Emericella montenegroi 
Emericella navahoensis 
Emericella olivicola 
Emericella omanensis 
Emericella pluriseminata 
Emericella purpurea 
Emericella qinqixianii 
Emericella similis
Emericella spectabilis 
Emericella stella-maris 
Emericella striata 
Emericella sublata 
Emericella undulata  
Emericella venezuelensis 
Emericella violacea

References

Trichocomaceae
Eurotiomycetes genera